Tadeusz Błotnicki (8 October 1858, Lwów - 28 March 1928, Kraków) was a Polish sculptor, active mainly in Kraków.

He was a disciple of Parys Filippi, and Kaspar von Zumbusch, from Vienna, and created many sculptures and busts in Cracow and throughout Galicia. He was also a known figure in the artistic spheres of pre-war Cracow and was friends with Gabriela Zapolska, Teofil Lenartowicz and Jacek Malczewski, who painted his portrait.

Major works
 bust of Stanisław Konarski at the entrance to the crypt of the Piarists church and inside the church
 allegory of Poetry, Drama and Comedy on the facade of the Słowacki Theatre in Cracow
 monument to Marcel Guyski and Oskar Kolberg in the Rakowicki Cemetery
 figure of Saint Joseph in the Capuchins church
 monument to Adam Mickiewicz (1898) in Stanislawow

References

External links

1858 births
1928 deaths
20th-century Polish sculptors
Polish male sculptors
20th-century Polish male artists
19th-century Polish sculptors
19th-century Polish male artists